T'anta wawa ("bread baby", from Aymara and Quechua  "bread" and  "child, baby"; hispanicized names: , tantaguaguas, tantahuahua, wawas de pan, tantawawas and muñecas de pan) is a type of sweet roll shaped and decorated in the form of a small child or infant. They are generally made of wheat and sometimes contain a sweet filling. They are made and eaten as part of ancestral rites in Andean regions of Bolivia, Ecuador, Peru, the south of Colombia, and the north of Argentina, mainly on All Souls' Day, but also as part of agricultural festivals, carnivals, and Christmas.

Regional characteristics

Ecuador
T'anta wawa are consumed on November 2 all over the Andean region. They are eaten with colada morada. They are made by families and exchanged among groups of family and friends and given to godchildren. In rural cemeteries and indigenous communities, such as Tungurahua Province, they are used as offerings as part of a ceremony of encounter with one's ancestors.

See also

 Pan de muerto
 List of Peruvian dishes
 List of Ecuadorian dishes and foods
 Bolivian cuisine

References 

Latin American cuisine
Ecuadorian cuisine
Peruvian cuisine
Breads